Ochetarcha is a genus of moths belonging to the subfamily Tortricinae of the family Tortricidae. It contains only one described species, Ochetarcha miraculosa, also known as the ponga stem borer, which is found in New Zealand.

Description 
The mature larva of this species is coloured a creamish-yellow and is between 15 to 20 mm long. 

The wingspan is about 23 mm. The forewings pale-brownish, strigulated with purplish-grey. The extreme costal edge is whitish-ochreous and there is some purplish suffusion towards the base of the costa. The hindwings are dark grey.

Behaviour 
The larva of this species create a sticky cone formed from its waste on the stems of its host plant. The larvae consume the fronds of its host toward the tip of stem and make tunnels of between 8 to 10 mm long. When at rest the adult moth holds its wings at a v-shaped angle. The adult moths are on the wing from December to March.

Hosts 
The larval host of this species Cyathea dealbata.

References

External links

tortricidae.com

Archipini
Taxa named by Edward Meyrick
Monotypic moth genera
Moths of New Zealand
Tortricidae genera
Endemic moths of New Zealand
Moths described in 1917